Criminal Minds is a police procedural that debuted on CBS on September 22, 2005. The series follows a team of profilers from the FBI's Behavioral Analysis Unit (BAU) based in Quantico, Virginia. The BAU is part of the FBI National Center for the Analysis of Violent Crime. The show differs from many procedural dramas by focusing on profiling the criminal, called the unsub or "unknown subject", rather than the crime itself. The series follows special agents Dr. Spencer Reid, Jennifer "JJ" Jareau, Penelope Garcia, Emily Prentiss, David Rossi, Dr. Tara Lewis, Luke Alvez, and Matt Simmons as they try to profile the unsub. Other former characters are Elle Greenaway, Jason Gideon, Jordan Todd, Ashley Seaver, Dr. Alex Blake, Kate Callahan, Derek Morgan, Aaron Hotchner and Stephen Walker.

On January 10, 2019, CBS renewed the series for a fifteenth and final season consisting of 10 episodes, which was held for mid-season. The season eventually premiered on January 8, 2020.  In 2021, Paramount+ announced that Criminal Minds would return with a sixteenth season titled Criminal Minds: Evolution containing 10 episodes which debuted on November 24, 2022.

Series overview

Episodes

Season 1 (2005–06)

Season 2 (2006–07)

Season 3 (2007–08)

Season 4 (2008–09)

Season 5 (2009–10)

Season 6 (2010–11)

Season 7 (2011–12)

Season 8 (2012–13)

Season 9 (2013–14)

Season 10 (2014–15)

Season 11 (2015–16)

Season 12 (2016–17)

Season 13 (2017–18)

Season 14 (2018–19)

Season 15 (2020)

Season 16: Evolution (2022–23)

Season 17

Home video releases

References

Criminal Minds
Criminal Minds

it:Criminal Minds#Episodi